Dhoruba al-Mujahid bin Wahad (born Richard Earl Moore; 1944) is an American writer and activist, Black Panther Party leader and co-founder of the Black Liberation Army. Dhoruba, in Swahili, means "the storm".

Early years
Richard Earl Moore was three years into a five-year sentence at Comstock Prison when he learned Malcolm X had been assassinated. Moore, who had a spotty disciplinary record at Comstock, felt the Nation of Islam was dogmatic and valued myrmidons rather than free thinkers, but he admired Malcolm X, who he felt "wasn't just a bow tie, a talking head. He was funny; he was witty; he was analytical."  Moore had been reading Malcolm X's teachings and speeches and had considered joining with Malcolm X's army after being released from prison, and was stunned by Malcolm X's public execution. Like many others, black and white alike, Moore believed Malcolm X had been killed by a combination of enemies in the Nation of Islam and law enforcement, and Moore decided the best way to honor his hero's legacy was "to think like Malcolm X, and take his message and apply it to his daily reality." Consequently, Moore converted to Islam, took the name Dhoruba al-Mujahid bin Wahad, and began reading political material, including both non-fiction (such as Edward Gibbon's The History of the Decline and Fall of the Roman Empire and Karl Marx's Das Kapital) as well as historical fiction (such as Leon Uris's Exodus and novels about Attila the Hun and Genghis Khan).

The shooting
On May 19, 1971, Thomas Curry and Nicholas Binetti, two New York City Police Department officers who were guarding the home of Frank S. Hogan, the Manhattan district attorney, were fired upon in a drive-by shooting, with a machine gun. The officers survived, but were seriously injured, sustaining shots to the head, neck, chest, and abdomen.

The shootings took place during a period of intense violence between black activist organizations and the New York City police department.  Two days later, NYPD officers Waverly Jones and Joseph Piagentini were shot and killed outside a housing project in Harlem.

Wahad was arrested and initially charged with robbing a South Bronx social club, and then was later charged with the attempted murders of Curry and Binetti.

Wahad's first trial ended in a hung jury; his second in a mistrial. Two years later, in 1973, his third trial resulted in a guilty verdict; he was sentenced to twenty-five years to life.

Prison and release
Wahad spent a total of nineteen years in prison. While incarcerated, he learned about Congressional hearings that disclosed the existence of a covert F.B.I. operation known as COINTELPRO.  In December 1975 he filed a lawsuit against the F.B.I. and the police department of the City of New York.

As a direct result of his lawsuit, over the next fifteen years the F.B.I. released more than 300,000 pages of documents regarding COINTELPRO.  The COINTELPRO documents were the basis on which Wahad appealed his conviction, and on March 15, 1990, Judge Peter J. McQuillan of the New York Supreme Court in Manhattan reversed it, ruling that the prosecution had failed to disclose evidence that could have helped Mr. Wahad's defense.

While Manhattan District Attorney Robert M. Morgenthau stated that he planned to appeal the ruling, and would obtain a retrial if his appeal failed, Wahad was freed and released without bail.

Morgenthau's attempt to appeal was rejected by the Appellate Division of the New York Supreme Court, and on January 20, 1995, the Manhattan district attorney's office stated there would be no retrial, indicating that the current condition of the evidence would make this impossible.

Lawsuits
In 1995, the F.B.I. settled with Wahad; the U.S. government paid him $400,000.

On December 4, 2000, Dhoruba's suit against the New York Police Department, seeking $15 million in damages was scheduled to begin. On December 8, 2000, the city of New York laid to rest a 25-year legal battle, and agreed to pay Wahad an additional $490,000 in damages.

Aftermath
Wahad lived in Accra, Ghana, where he organized on Pan-Africanism and the prison system.  Using the funds from his settlements for personal damages from the FBI and City of New York, he established the Campaign to Free Black and New African Political Prisoners (formerly the Campaign to Free Black Political Prisoners and Prisoners-of-War) and founded the Institute for the Development of Pan-African policy in Ghana.

He currently lives in New York City and continues his work.

Assault by "New" Black Panther Party
On August 19, 2015, Bin Wahad and an associate were assaulted by a faction of the New Black Panther Party. Bin Wahad had been attending a conference in Atlanta, Georgia held by the Nzinga faction of the "New" Panthers, where Bin Wahad confronted the group about their adoption of the Black Panther name and their rhetoric. The two were ordered to leave but when they refused, Bin Wahad was assaulted. Wahad was left with a concussion, a broken jaw and lacerations from the attack. The event led founding member of the original Black Panthers, Elbert "Big Man" Howard, to denounce the group as "reactionaries" and "thugs".

Bibliography

Books

Essays

References

Books

Magazines and newspapers

Films

Music

Notes

External links

 
 
 
 

1944 births
Living people
Writers from New York City
American political writers
American male non-fiction writers
American prisoners and detainees
Overturned convictions in the United States
Members of the Black Panther Party
Members of the Black Liberation Army
Members of the Nation of Islam
COINTELPRO targets
Activists from New York City
American people convicted of attempted murder
African-American male writers
20th-century African-American writers